Aurèle Chartrand,  (October 14, 1903 – May 21, 1975) was an Ontario barrister and political figure. He represented Ottawa East in the Legislative Assembly of Ontario as a Liberal from 1945 to 1955.

He was born in Ottawa, Ontario, the son of Zenon Chartrand, and was educated at the University of Ottawa and Osgoode Hall. He was named King's Counsel in 1948. Chartrand was an unsuccessful candidate in the 1940 by-election held for the provincial seat when Robert Laurier was elected. He died at an Ottawa hospital in 1975.

References 

 Canadian Parliamentary Guide, 1952, GP Normandin

External links 
Member's parliamentary history for the Legislative Assembly of Ontario

1903 births
1975 deaths
Ontario Liberal Party MPPs
Franco-Ontarian people
Canadian King's Counsel
Politicians from Ottawa